Aaron Tshibola (born 2 January 1995) is a professional footballer who plays as a midfielder for AEL Limassol. Born in London, he came through the youth ranks at Reading before moving to Aston Villa in 2016. He represented England at U18 level in 2013 but has since been called up by DR Congo and played in a friendly match for the side in March 2018. He has had loan spells at English Football League sides Hartlepool United, Nottingham Forest and Milton Keynes Dons, as well as Scottish Premiership side Kilmarnock. He has also played in Belgium for Waasland Beveren and in Portugal for Aves.

Early life
Tshibola was born in the London Borough of Newham in England.

Club career

Reading
Tshibola joined Reading's academy at age thirteen and signed his first professional deal with the club in March 2011. While in the Reading Academy, Tshibola went on trial with Manchester United.

Ahead of the 2014–15 season, Tshibola signed a new contract with Reading, keeping him at the club until 2016. Then on 23 August 2014, he made his professional debut as an 86th-minute substitute in a Championship fixture against Nottingham Forest.

On 9 September 2015, Tshibola extended his contract with Reading until the summer of 2019.

On 2 January 2015, he moved to League Two side Hartlepool United on a one-month loan deal, before making his debut the next day in a 1–0 loss against Wycombe Wanderers. His first four appearances at the club earned Tshibola a loan extension until the end of the season. His loan spell extension led manager Ronnie Moore to thank Tshibola for his commitment at Hartlepool United. He was then awarded Man of the match, in a 3–2 win over Plymouth Argyle after an impressive performance when he assisted one of the goals in the game.

Aston Villa
On 10 July 2016, Tshibola moved to Aston Villa on a four-year contract, for an undisclosed fee. He scored his first goal for the club in a 1–1 draw with Newcastle United on 24 September 2016. On 30 January 2017, Tshibola moved to Nottingham Forest on loan for the remainder of the 2016–17 season.

On 27 July 2017, Tshibola joined EFL League One side Milton Keynes Dons on a season-long loan deal. He scored his first goal for MK Dons in an EFL Trophy tie against Brighton & Hove Albion Under-23s on 29 August 2017. On 9 November 2017 he returned to Aston Villa following the mutual termination of his loan with Milton Keynes Dons.

Kilmarnock
Tshibola was loaned to Scottish Premiership club Kilmarnock in January 2018, working under his former Reading manager Steve Clarke. He made his debut for Killie on 3 February 2018, as a 65th minute substitute for Kris Boyd in the Ayrshire side's 1–0 win over Scottish Premiership Champions Celtic. Tshibola scored his first Kilmarnock goal in the 4–0 Scottish Cup win over Brora Rangers the following week. After six months, he returned to Aston Villa, only to be loaned back out to Kilmarnock for another season on 29 August 2018.

Waasland Beveren
On 29 August 2019, Tshibola signed for Belgian club Waasland Beveren for an undisclosed fee. On 19 October 2019, Tshibola made his debut in a 2–0 defeat to Gent.

Aves
On 31 January 2020, Tshibola signed for Portuguese side Aves on a one-and-a-half year contract. On 1 March 2020, Tshibola made his debut, coming on as substitute in a 3–1 defeat to F.C. Paços de Ferreira. He made one other appearance in a 2–0 defeat to Sporting CP before the league was suspended due to the COVID-19 pandemic in Portugal.

On 13 July 2020, Tshibola announced on his Twitter account that due to financial difficulties at the club, he had left Aves and was a free agent once again.

Kilmarnock
On 31 July 2020, Tshibola returned for a third spell with Kilmarnock, signing a one-year contract. He left Kilmarnock at the end of the 2020–21 season.

Gençlerbirliği
In July 2021, Tshibola signed for Turkish side Gençlerbirliği. He made his debut playing 90 minutes of a 0–0 draw with Adanaspor. On 19 December 2021, Tshibola scored his first goal in Turkish football, in a 5–0 victory over Menemenspor.

AEL Limassol
On 12 August 2022, Cypriot First Division club AEL Limassol announced that Tshibola had joined the club. He made his debut of the club on 28 August 2022, in a 2–1 away defeat to local rivals Aris Limassol. He scored his first goal in Cyprus on 28 October 2022, in a 3–0 victory over Akritas Chlorakas.

International career
Tshibola was called up by England U18 and made his debut, coming on as a substitute in the second half, in a 1–0 loss against Belgium on 5 March 2013.

He is also eligible to represent The Democratic Republic of the Congo due to his ancestry. He was called up to the DR Congo national football team for a friendly against Kenya on 26 March 2017, but did not make an appearance. On 27 March 2018, he finally made his senior international debut for DR Congo, playing 45 minutes in a friendly against Tanzania.

Career statistics

Honours
Reading U21
U21 Premier League Cup: 2013–14
Gençlerbirliği

 TSYD Cup: 2021–22

References

External links
Aaron Tshibola profile at Reading F.C

England profile at the FA

1995 births
Living people
English sportspeople of Democratic Republic of the Congo descent
English footballers
Footballers from the London Borough of Newham
Democratic Republic of the Congo footballers
Association football midfielders
Democratic Republic of the Congo international footballers
England youth international footballers
English Football League players
Scottish Professional Football League players
Belgian Pro League players
Primeira Liga players
TFF First League players
Reading F.C. players
Hartlepool United F.C. players
Aston Villa F.C. players
Nottingham Forest F.C. players
Milton Keynes Dons F.C. players
Kilmarnock F.C. players
S.K. Beveren players
C.D. Aves players
Gençlerbirliği S.K. footballers
AEL Limassol players
English expatriate footballers
Democratic Republic of the Congo expatriate footballers
Democratic Republic of the Congo expatriate sportspeople in Belgium
Expatriate footballers in Belgium
Democratic Republic of the Congo expatriate sportspeople in Turkey
Expatriate footballers in Turkey
Democratic Republic of the Congo expatriate sportspeople in Cyprus
Democratic Republic of the Congo expatriate sportspeople in Portugal

Cypriot First Division players